Nimble Storage, founded in 2008, produced hardware and software products for data storage, specifically data storage arrays that use the iSCSI and Fibre Channel protocols and includes data backup and data protection features. Nimble is now a subsidiary of Hewlett Packard Enterprise.

History
Nimble Storage was founded in January 2008 by Varun Mehta and Umesh Maheshwari. Nimble announced its first product, the CS200 series hybrid arrays, in July 2010 at Tech Field Day.

In September 2012, Nimble Storage secured $40.7 million from original backers as well as new investors Artis Capital Management and GGV Capital.

Varun Mehta was chief executive until March 2011, when he became vice president of engineering and Suresh Vasudevan became CEO. Umesh Maheshwari became chief technology officer.

In October 2013 the company filed for its initial public offering on the New York Stock Exchange. Nimble Storage went public on the NYSE on December 13, 2013, under the ticker symbol NMBL.

In June 2014, Nimble Storage announced the CS700 Series Arrays and an All-Flash Shelf, as well as its Adaptive Flash technology.

In August 2014, Nimble Storage completed an overhaul of their CS-Series, and added the CS300 and CS500 to their line-up.

In November 2014, Nimble Storage released arrays supporting the Fibre Channel protocol.

In July 2015, Nimble Storage announced updates to the Adaptive Flash platform, including Nimble SmartSecure (software-based encryption), all-flash service levels, the addition of REST APIs, InfoSight-VMVision per-VM monitoring, and integrated data protection.

In August 2015, Nimble Storage announced the completion of Federal Information Processing Standard 140-2 Certification from the National Institute of Standards and Technology for the Adaptive Flash platform.

In November 2015, Nimble Storage was sixth on Deloitte's ranking of the 500 fastest growing technology, media, telecommunications, life sciences, and energy tech companies in North America.

In December 2015, Nimble Storage announced an expanded SmartStack technology for Cisco Systems products.

On February 23, 2016, Nimble Storage unveiled the Predictive All Flash Array series, combining fast flash performance with InfoSight Predictive Analytics.

On August 10, 2016, Nimble Storage announced the AF-1000 Series All Flash array as well as an updated CS-Series Adaptive Flash array portfolio.

On October 17, 2016, Lenovo announced a strategic partnership with Nimble Storage. The first line of offerings from this partnership is the ThinkAgile CX Series solution.

On March 7, 2017, Hewlett Packard Enterprise announced they are to buy Nimble Storage for approximately $1.09 billion cash. The acquisition became final on April 5, 2017.

Products

All Flash Arrays
Nimble Storage's AF-Series arrays utilize flash performance as well as InfoSight Predictive Analytics. The AF-Series has product lines for data centers with different configurations based on the desired workload. The product lines are AF1000, AF3000, AF5000, AF7000, and AF9000.

Adaptive Flash Arrays
The Nimble CS-Series iSCSI and Fibre Channel storage array has 4 product lines for data centers available in each CS-Series. The product lines are CS200, CS300, CS500, and CS700 and combine both HDDs with SSDs in a hybrid fashion. In August 2016, Nimble Storage updated their CS-Series arrays to the following: CS1000/H, CS3000, CS5000, and CS7000. Nimble Storage also provides an All-Flash Shelf to add to CS-Series arrays.

Secondary Flash Arrays
The Secondary Flash Array was the first new Nimble product to be launched post merger with Hewlett Packard Enterprise. It is a hybrid system based around the standard Nimble architecture but with enhanced de-duplication. The product is intended as a target for backups.

SmartStack reference architectures
Nimble Storage provides SmartStack integrated infrastructure technology for Cisco Systems. Jointly developed by Cisco and Nimble Storage, these SmartStack integrates compute, network, and storage resources. SmartStack provides Cisco Validated Designs and reference architectures that address the following workloads: desktop virtualization (or VDI), server virtualization and cloud computing, business-critical applications, Oracle database and applications, and SAP HANA.

Technology

NimbleOS
NimbleOS is Nimble's operating system. It utilizes a patented file-system architecture and cache accelerated sequential layout (CASL). NimbleOS includes flexible flash scaling, adaptive flash service levels, dynamic flash-based read caching, write-optimized data layout, inline compression, scale-to-fit flexibility, scale out, snapshots and integrated data protection, efficient replication, deduplication, and zero-copy clones.

InfoSight Predictive Analytics
InfoSight is Nimble Storage's storage management and predictive analytics portal. It is designed to help with storage resource management as well as customer support.

InfoSight consists of:
 The InfoSight Engine: a data collection and analysis engine composed of data analytics, system modeling capabilities, and predictive algorithms.
 The InfoSight Portal: a secure online portal which serves as a window into the InfoSight Engine.
 Proactive Wellness: proactive alerts for system health, performance, and protection gaps.

Unified Flash Fabric
Nimble Storage's Unified Flash Fabric unifies Nimble's All Flash and Adaptive Flash arrays into a consolidated architecture with common data services. This architecture is built upon existing CASL architecture and InfoSight.

References

External links

 HPE Nimble Storage web page

2017 mergers and acquisitions
American companies established in 2008
American companies disestablished in 2017
Computer companies established in 2008
Computer companies disestablished in 2017
Computer companies of the United States
Manufacturing companies based in San Jose, California
Computer storage companies
Storage Area Network companies
Hewlett-Packard Enterprise acquisitions